Steamboat is an unincorporated community in Jackson County, Oregon, United States. It lies along Carberry Creek, a tributary of the Applegate River, in the Rogue River – Siskiyou National Forest.

According to Oregon Geographic Names (OGN), the name Steamboat derives from a mining term, "steamboated", meaning worked out or not up to expectations. Steamboat Mine is slightly northeast of Steamboat.  The community had a post office named Steamboat that operated from 1888 to 1915.

Other geographic features in the state have been similarly named, for example Steamboat Mountain near Steamboat and Steamboat Creek in the Calapooya Mountains. The creek is associated with another unincorporated community named Steamboat in Douglas County.

References

Unincorporated communities in Jackson County, Oregon
Unincorporated communities in Oregon